The Chieftains 3 is the third album released by the Irish musical group The Chieftains in 1971.

The tight formula of the first two albums loosened up on the third album. For the first time there was a mazurka (which on the original vinyl release, on the record itself, was erroneously labelled "Sonny's Maxurka"). There is still no singing, but Pat Kilduff added lilting on two tracks.

Track listing
"Strike the Gay Harp / Tiarna Maigheó (Lord Mayo) / The Lady on the Island / The Sailor on the Rock"  – 
"Sonny's Mazurka / Tommy Hunt's Jig"  – 
"Eibhlí Gheal Chiún ní Chearbhaill (Bright Quiet Eily O'Carroll) / Delahunty's Hornpipe"  – 
"The Hunter's Purse"  – 
"March of the King of Laois" or "Ruairí Óg Ó Mordha"  – 
"Carolan's Concerto or Mrs Poer"  – 
"Tom Billy's Reel / The Road to Lisdoonvarna / The Merry Sisters"  – 
"An Ghaoth Aneas (The South Wind)"  – 
"Tiarna Isne Chaoin (Lord Inchiquin)"  – 
"The Trip to Sligo"  – 
"An Raibh Tú ag an gCarraig? (Were You at the Rock?)"  – 
"John Kelly's Slide / Merrily Kiss the Quaker / Denis Murphy's Slide"  –

Personnel
The Chieftains
Paddy Moloney - uillean pipes, tin whistle, arrangements, conductor
Michael Tubridy - flute, concertina, tin whistle
Seán Potts - tin whistle
Martin Fay - fiddle
Seán Keane - fiddle
Peadar Mercier - bodhrán, bones
with:
Pat Kilduff - lilting on "The Hunter's Purse" and "Merrily Kiss The Quaker"
Producer: Gareth a Brun (Garech Browne)
Liner notes by Seán MacRéamoinn, Hamish Henderson and Susannah York.

References

Sources and links
 

The Chieftains albums
1971 albums
Claddagh Records albums